Timothy Dwight Hobart (October 6, 1855 – May 19, 1935) was an American businessman, best known as the manager of the JA Ranch. He was also mayor of Pampa, Texas.

References

1855 births
1935 deaths
People from Berlin, Vermont
Ranchers from Texas
Businesspeople from Texas
People from Palestine, Texas
People from Mobeetie, Texas
Mayors of places in Texas
People from Pampa, Texas
American city founders
Texas Republicans
Texas Democrats
American Congregationalists
American Presbyterians
Deaths from pneumonia in Texas
Burials in Texas
Educators from Texas